The Miles M.28 Mercury was a British aircraft designed to meet the need for a training and communications plane during the Second World War. It was a single-engined monoplane of wooden construction with a twin tail and a tailwheel undercarriage with retractable main units.

Development
Originally, the M.28 had been planned as a replacement for the Whitney Straight and Monarch, but this was shelved when war broke out.

In 1941, the project was revived in response to a requirement for a training and communications aircraft. The design was produced as a private venture by Ray Bournon using Miles' normal wooden construction. The resulting machine introduced several features not found on trainers: retractable undercarriage and trailing edge flaps amongst others.

The prototype first flew on 11 July 1941  and proved easy to fly, with light controls and a short landing run. Owing to Miles' heavy commitment to war-production, however, only six aircraft were built, of slightly varying specifications, the last being the Mercury 6 which first flew in early 1946. Examples of the type were operated in the United Kingdom, Denmark, Germany, Switzerland and Australia.

Variants
M.28 Mark I: First prototype – Two seat trainer, powered by  de Havilland Gipsy Major I engine.
 M.28 Mark II: Three seat trainer (with dual controls) powered by  de Havilland Gipsy Major IIA. One built 1942. Re-engined with 140 hp Blackburn Cirrus Major II and then with a  Cirrus Major III post-war.
 M.28 Mark III: Three seat trainer with triple controls for two students and one instructor, powered by 150 hp Cirrus Major 3 and with revised wing section. One built (PW937).
 M.28 Mark IV: Four seat communications aircraft powered by  Gipsy Major IIA. One built 1944.
 M.28 Mark V: Post-war four-seater powered by Cirrus Major III. Square rear windows. One built 1947.
 M.28 Mark VI: Post war four-seater powered by Cirrus Major III. Round rear windows. One built 1946.

Specifications (M.28)

See also

References

Notes

Bibliography

 Amos, Peter. and Brown, Don Lambert. Miles Aircraft Since 1925, Volume 1. London: Putnam Aeronautical, 2000. .  
 Brown, Don Lambert. Miles Aircraft Since 1925. London: Putnam & Company Ltd., 1970. . 
 Jackson, A.J. British Civil Aircraft since 1919 - Volume 3. 1974. Putnam & Company Ltd. .
 Jerram, Mike. "For Business And Pleasure—No. 3", Aeroplane Monthly, Vol. 14, No. 9, September 1986. pp. 474–477. .
 Mason, Tim. The Secret Years: Flight Testing at Boscombe Down, 1939-1945. Crowborough, UK: Hikoki Publications, 2010. .
 Mondey, David. The Hamlyn Concise Guide to British Aircraft of World War II. London: Chancellor Press, 2002. .

1940s British military trainer aircraft
1940s British military utility aircraft
1940s British civil utility aircraft
Miles aircraft
Single-engined tractor aircraft
Low-wing aircraft
Aircraft first flown in 1941
Twin-tail aircraft